Josip Križaj (5 March 1887 in Vevče, Ljubljana – 30 July 1968 in Zagreb) was a Slovene opera singer. He was a bass who started performing at the Zagreb Opera in 1913 and was the recipient of the Vladimir Nazor Award for lifetime achievement in music in 1963.

References

1887 births
1968 deaths
Slovenian opera singers
Slovenian emigrants to Croatia
People from the City Municipality of Ljubljana
Vladimir Nazor Award winners
Yugoslav male opera singers